The Textile Museum is a museum in Palmerah, West Jakarta, Indonesia. The museum houses a collection of textiles from various islands in Indonesia.

History 
The Textile Museum building was constructed in the early 19th century. Initially it was a private house of a Frenchman. The building was later sold to Abdul Aziz Al Mussawi al Musa Khadim, a Turkish consul for Batavia. In 1942, the building was sold again to Karel Cristian Cruq.

The building had been used as the headquarters of Barisan Keamanan Rakyat ("Front of People's Safety") during the struggle for independence period. In 1947  it was owned by Lie Sion Phin who rented it to the Department of Social Affairs which modified it into an institution for elderly people. Afterwards the building was handed over to the city's government.

On July 28, 1976, it was inaugurated as the Textile Museum by Madame Tien Soeharto.

Collections 
The textile museum exhibits many kinds of Indonesian traditional weaving such as Javanese batik, Batak ulos, and ikat. There are also displays of traditional weaving instruments and equipment for textile production.

See also
Colonial architecture of Indonesia
Indonesian Heritage Society

References

External links 

Museums in Jakarta
Textile museums
Museums established in 1978
1978 establishments in Indonesia
Colonial architecture in Jakarta
Art museums and galleries in Indonesia
Cultural Properties of Indonesia in Jakarta
West Jakarta